Spanish Fly is an album by Lisa Lisa and Cult Jam, released in 1987. The singles "Head to Toe" and "Lost in Emotion" both reached number one in the United States. The album peaked at No. 7 on the Billboard 200. It has sold more than a million copies.

Production
The album was written and produced by Full Force.

Critical reception
People wrote that Lisa has "a rich, versatile sound and the vocal strength to penetrate the album’s percussion-heavy arrangements." The Globe and Mail thought that Lisa's "accounts of her various sex and dance urges are both funny and salacious." The Los Angeles Times called the album "an urban contemporary kitchen sink—everything is in there, from dance to doo-wop to crackling funk to spicy salsa." USA Today deemed Lisa "today's Ronnie Spector: a technically limited singer who succeeds by projecting a girlish attitude that's both vulnerable and indomitable."

Track listing

Charts

Weekly charts

Year-end charts

Certifications

Personnel
Lisa Lisa (Lisa Velez): Vocals
Michael Hughes: Congas, timbales, talking
Spanador: Guitars, Bass, keyboards
Full Force: Performer
Arranged and produced by Full Force
Engineered by Glenn Rosenstein
Mixed by Full Force and Glenn Rosenstein
Jurgen S. Korduletsch, Don Orilo, Steve Salem: Executive Producers

References

Lisa Lisa and Cult Jam albums
1987 albums
Columbia Records albums
Albums produced by Full Force